Techrules is a Chinese automobile manufacturer headquartered in Yizhuang, China that specializes in producing sports cars.

History
Tecrules was founded in 2015, and is based in Yizhuang, China.

The AT96 was Techrules's first car, coming out in 2016. It uses a multi-fuel (jet fuel, kerosene, natural gas, biogas) aviation turbine to charge the batteries. It has 1030 hp and 6372 lb-ft of torque, a 0-60 mph time of 2.5 seconds, and a top speed of 218 mph. The GT96 was an all diesel version of the AT96.

Their second vehicle was the Tecrules Ren, which came out in 2018. It is a high performance sports car that uses a diesel turbine engine as well as an option of 3 electric batteries. Its annual output is 10 units per year.  It has a top speed of 199 mph.  The Ren is not street legal in the US or Europe.

Vehicles

Current models
Techrules currently has three production vehicles.

See also
 Leapmotor
 Levdeo
 Aoxin

References

External links 

Car brands
Car manufacturers of China
Chinese brands
Techrules vehicles